House of Pride was a Canadian television soap opera, which aired on CBC Television from 1974 to 1976.

The series opened with the death of family patriarch Dan Pride (George Waite), and focused on the families of his five adult children. Each of the families lived in a different Canadian city; the series had production units in Vancouver, Winnipeg, Toronto, Montreal and Halifax.

The cast included Charmion King, Lynne Griffin, Budd Knapp, Linda Sorenson, Colin Fox, Murray Westgate and Sébastien Dhavernas.

References

External links

Canadian television soap operas
CBC Television original programming
1974 Canadian television series debuts
1976 Canadian television series endings
1970s Canadian drama television series